"Massive" is a house song by Canadian rapper and singer Drake. It was sent to contemporary hit radio through Republic Records and OVO Sound as the dual lead single from his seventh studio album, Honestly, Nevermind, on June 21, 2022, alongside the single "Sticky". Drake wrote the song with singer Tresor and with producers Gordo, Johannes Klahr, and Richard Zastenker.

Composition and lyrics
"Massive" was praised by Rolling Stone who said it could "easily fit on a DJ mix". The song includes samples and a piano-based instrumental line.

Critical reception
HipHopDX said "Massive" was the album's "clearest radio smash". Evening Standard said the song is "the cheesiest moment" on the album.  Variety noted the song's funeral theme and "concluded that the song’s mood casts it as a wry aside, rather than, well, sociopathic".

Charts

Weekly charts

Year-end charts

Certifications

Release history

References

 

 
2022 songs
2022 singles
Drake (musician) songs
Songs written by Drake (musician)
OVO Sound singles
Republic Records singles
House music songs